This article is a list of countries and international organizations based on their official position in the Macedonia naming dispute between Greece and the then-named Macedonia (now North Macedonia). The naming dispute was resolved in February 2019 after the signing of the Prespa Agreement.

Countries/entities that used "Republic of Macedonia" for bilateral purposes 

According to statements of the Macedonian government, 134 foreign nations had recognized the country under the name of "Republic of Macedonia" as of January 2017. Some had used this name from the outset, others switched their stance after originally using the UN reference "the former Yugoslav Republic of Macedonia" (notably the United States under George W. Bush's administration), while, less commonly, the opposite also had been observed (as in the case of Mexico, withdrawing its previous recognition).

The following list consists of some of the countries and entities that used the name "Republic of Macedonia"

Permanent members of the UN Security Council, except France:
 (NATO and G7 member)
 (NATO and G7 member)

States formerly part of SFR Yugoslavia:

 (EU and NATO member)

 (EU and NATO member)
 Although not a State in SFR Yugoslavia, Kosovo was a Province in Southern Serbia that is still very tense in territorial dispute.

Neighboring countries, except Greece and Albania:
 (EU and NATO member)

Others:

 (EU member)

 (NATO and G8 member)

 (EU and NATO member)

 (EU and NATO member)

 (EU Member)

 (EU and NATO member)
 (NATO Member)

 (EU member)

 (EU and NATO member)
 (EU and NATO member)

 (EU member)

 (Burma)

 (NATO member)

 (EU and NATO member)

 (EU and NATO member)

 (EU and NATO member)

 (EU member)

 (NATO member)

Countries/entities that used "the former Yugoslav Republic of Macedonia" for all official purposes 
 
  (EU and NATO member)
  (no diplomatic relations; EU member)
  (EU and NATO member)

 (EU, NATO, G8 and permanent UN Security Council member)
 (EU, NATO and G8 member)
 (EU and NATO member)
 (G8 member)
  (EU and NATO member)

  (EU and NATO member)
 
  (EU and NATO member)
  (no diplomatic relations)

 (EU and NATO member)

Countries/entities where naming was unclear 

Conflicting or inconclusive reports on name usage or recognition:

 Afghanistan
 (NATO member)

 (EU, NATO and G8 member)

  Republic of China (Taiwan) (no diplomatic relations since 2001)

No reports on name usage or recognition 
These countries/entities have no diplomatic relations with the state:

States with limited recognition

International organizations 

The following international organizations had used the reference adopted by the UN – "former Yugoslav Republic of Macedonia" (or a variant thereof) in their official proceedings:

United Nations At the UN Headquarters in New York, member states' flags are flown in alphabetical order of their English names; during the dispute, the republic's flag was sorted under "T" for "The Former Yugoslav Republic of Macedonia".
European Union
NATO with a footnote in all referring documents that Turkey recognizes the country as Macedonia
International Monetary Fund
OECD and DAC–OECD (Development Co-operation Directorate),
World Trade Organization
International Olympic Committee
International Paralympic Committee
World Bank
Council of Europe
European Bank for Reconstruction and Development
Organization for Security and Co-operation in Europe
FIFA
UEFA
FIBA
CERN
EBU
FIDE
Organisation internationale de la Francophonie
International Mathematics Olympiad
Association of Tennis Professionals

References

Foreign relations of North Macedonia
Politics of North Macedonia
Macedonia